Megascelis is a genus of leaf beetles in the subfamily Eumolpinae. It is known from both North and South America. There are around 140 described species in Megascelis.

The genus is traditionally placed in the tribe Megascelidini, which was formerly considered a separate subfamily. However, according to ITIS, it is now placed in Eumolpini.

Nomenclature
The generic name "Megascelis" first appeared as a nomen nudum in Dejean's Catalogue of Coleoptera in 1821. According to Barber & Bridwell (1940), the name Megascelis became available in Sturm (1826), where the species Megascelis aenea is described. This species is considered the type species of the genus. However, according to Tiape Gómez & Savini (2001), the name Megascelis should instead be attributed to Latreille (1825), who was the first to give a description of the genus.

Species
These species belong to the genus Megascelis:

 Megascelis acuminata Pic, 1910
 Megascelis acutipennis Lacordaire, 1845
 Megascelis aenea Sturm, 1826 g
 Megascelis aerea Lacordaire, 1845
 Megascelis affinis Lacordaire, 1845
 Megascelis altamira Tiape Gómez & Savini, 2001
 Megascelis amabilis Lacordaire, 1845
 Megascelis amabilis amabilis Lacordaire, 1845
 Megascelis amabilis caripennis Bechyné, 1997
 Megascelis ambigua Clark, 1866
 Megascelis anguina Lacordaire, 1845
 Megascelis anisobia Tiape Gómez & Savini, 2001
 Megascelis argutula Lacordaire, 1845
 Megascelis asperula Lacordaire, 1845 g
 Megascelis aureola Lacordaire, 1845
 Megascelis baeri Pic, 1910
 Megascelis basalis Baly, 1878
 Megascelis bitaeniata Lacordaire, 1845
 Megascelis boliviensis Pic, 1911
 Megascelis briseis Bates, 1866
 Megascelis brunnipennis Clark, 1866
 Megascelis brunnipes Lacordaire, 1845
 Megascelis carbonera Tiape Gómez & Savini, 2001
 Megascelis championi Jacoby, 1888
 Megascelis chloris Lacordaire, 1845 g
 Megascelis circumducta Lacordaire, 1845
 Megascelis cleroides Bates, 1866
 Megascelis coccinea Papp, 1951
 Megascelis collaris Jacoby, 1888
 Megascelis columbina Lacordaire, 1845
 Megascelis corcula Bates, 1866
 Megascelis crenipes Lacordaire, 1845
 Megascelis crucifera Clark, 1866
 Megascelis curta Lacordaire, 1845
 Megascelis cyanoptera Kirsch, 1875
 Megascelis decora Bates, 1866
 Megascelis dilecta Clark, 1866
 Megascelis discicollis Kirsch, 1875
 Megascelis dispar Bates, 1866
 Megascelis donckieri Pic, 1910
 Megascelis doralis Clark, 1866
 Megascelis dryas Clark, 1866
 Megascelis dubiosa Jacoby, 1878
 Megascelis elegans Baly, 1861
 Megascelis elegantula Lacordaire, 1845
 Megascelis exclamationis Clark, 1866
 Megascelis exilis Lacordaire, 1845
 Megascelis fasciolata Lacordaire, 1845 g
 Megascelis fatuella Lacordaire, 1845 g
 Megascelis femoralis Jacoby, 1878
 Megascelis femorata Baly, 1878
 Megascelis fissurata Tiape Gómez & Savini, 2001
 Megascelis flavipes Lacordaire, 1845 g
 Megascelis frenata Lacordaire, 1845
 Megascelis frenata bicolor Lacordaire, 1845
 Megascelis frenata frenata Lacordaire, 1845
 Megascelis frontalis Clark, 1866
 Megascelis fulgida Lacordaire, 1845
 Megascelis fulvipes Lacordaire, 1845
 Megascelis fusipes Tiape Gómez & Savini, 2001
 Megascelis gounellei Pic, 1911
 Megascelis gracilis Lacordaire, 1845
 Megascelis grayi Clark, 1866
 Megascelis herbacea Lacordaire, 1845
 Megascelis humeronotata Clark, 1866
 Megascelis inscriptis Papp, 1952
 Megascelis insignis Lacordaire, 1845
 Megascelis integra Kirsch, 1875
 Megascelis jacobyi Clavareau, 1905
 Megascelis joliveti Papp, 1952
 Megascelis lacertina Lacordaire, 1845
 Megascelis laevicoma Bates, 1866
 Megascelis larvata Clark, 1866
 Megascelis lemoides Monrós, 1959
 Megascelis lucida Lacordaire, 1845
 Megascelis luculenta Lacordaire, 1845 g
 Megascelis melancholica Jacoby, 1878
 Megascelis mexicana Jacoby, 1888
 Megascelis minuta Jacoby, 1888
 Megascelis miranda Tiape Gómez & Savini, 2001
 Megascelis misella Lacordaire, 1845
 Megascelis mucronata Lacordaire, 1845
 Megascelis nigripennis Bates, 1866
 Megascelis obscurevittata Bates, 1866
 Megascelis opalina Lacordaire, 1845
 Megascelis ornata Jacoby, 1878
 Megascelis parallela Harold, 1870
 Megascelis picturata Monrós, 1959
 Megascelis postica Lacordaire, 1845
 Megascelis posticata Baly, 1878
 Megascelis prasina Chevrolat, 1844
 Megascelis princeps Bates, 1866
 Megascelis proteus Tiape Gómez & Savini, 2001
 Megascelis puella Lacordaire, 1845
 Megascelis purpurea Perty, 1832
 Megascelis purpureicollis Jacoby, 1877
 Megascelis purpureipennis Clark, 1866 g
 Megascelis purpureiotincta Clark, 1866
 Megascelis quadrimaculata Bates, 1866
 Megascelis quadrisignata Jacoby, 1888
 Megascelis robusta Jacoby, 1888
 Megascelis rubricollis Bates, 1866
 Megascelis ruficollis Kirsch, 1875
 Megascelis rufipes Lacordaire, 1845 g
 Megascelis rufotestacea Clark, 1866
 Megascelis sacerdotalis Clark, 1866
 Megascelis sallei Jacoby, 1888
 Megascelis sapphireipennis Lacordaire, 1845
 Megascelis satrapa Lacordaire, 1845
 Megascelis semipurpurea Clark, 1866
 Megascelis semiviolacea Pic, 1910
 Megascelis semiviridis Pic, 1914 g
 Megascelis smaragdula Lacordaire, 1845
 Megascelis socialis Bates, 1866
 Megascelis spinipes Jacoby, 1888
 Megascelis stratiotica Lacordaire, 1845
 Megascelis submetallescens Jacoby, 1878
 Megascelis subtilis Boheman, 1859 i c g
 Megascelis suturalis Lacordaire, 1845
 Megascelis taeniata Kirsch, 1875
 Megascelis tenella Lacordaire, 1845 g
 Megascelis texana Linell, 1898 i c g b
 Megascelis tibialis Jacoby, 1888
 Megascelis titan Clark, 1866
 Megascelis tricolor Lacordaire, 1845
 Megascelis unicolor Lacordaire, 1845 g
 Megascelis virgo Lacordaire, 1845
 Megascelis viridana Lacordaire, 1845
 Megascelis viridipallens Clark, 1866
 Megascelis viridis Illiger, 1807
 Megascelis viridisimplex Clark, 1866
 Megascelis vittata (Fabricius, 1801) g
 Megascelis vittatipennis Jacoby, 1888
 Megascelis yepezi Tiape Gómez & Savini, 2001
 Megascelis yungarum Monrós, 1959

Data sources: i = ITIS, c = Catalogue of Life, g = GBIF, b = Bugguide.net

References

Further reading

 

Eumolpinae
Chrysomelidae genera
Beetles of North America
Beetles of South America
Articles created by Qbugbot
Taxa named by Pierre André Latreille